Moores Mill is a census-designated place (CDP) in Blair County, Pennsylvania, United States. It was first listed as a CDP prior to the 2020 census.

The CDP is in eastern Blair County, in the northeastern portion of Frankstown Township. It is on the east side of Beaver Dam Road in the valley of Canoe Creek, a southward-flowing tributary of the Frankstown Branch of the Juniata River, part of the Susquehanna River watershed.

Demographics

References 

Census-designated places in Blair County, Pennsylvania
Census-designated places in Pennsylvania